Nathalie is an unincorporated community and census-designated place (CDP) in Halifax County, Virginia, United States, in the south-central region of the state. The population as of the 2010 census was 183.

Geography
The community is drained by tributaries of Catawba Creek, which flows northeast to the Roanoke River at Clarkton.

History
It received its name in 1890 or 1891, being named after Natalie Otey (not "Nathalie"), daughter of Mrs. Rebecca Wimbish, an important local landowner. Prior to that time, the village at this location was considered to be a part of the Nathaniel Barksdale plantation. It had included a church since 1773 (the first Catawba Baptist Church) and a post office since 1828. This post office continues to operate today with the ZIP code of 24577.

References

Census-designated places in Halifax County, Virginia
Census-designated places in Virginia